Felicia Diana Barton (born March 6, 1982) is an American singer and songwriter, best known for her appearance on the eighth season of American Idol in 2009. Since 2013, she has joined Warner-Chappell Music and Pulse Recording as a songwriter, and has co-written songs for Demi Lovato, Seohyun and Lea Michele.

Career

American Idol

Barton auditioned for the eighth season of American Idol in Louisville, Kentucky. In the final round of Hollywood, Barton was eliminated by the judges. The day after the episode containing her elimination, it was announced that semi-finalist Joanna Pacitti had been disqualified, and that Barton would replace her in the Top 36. Barton performed in the third semi-finalist group, and received positive response for her performance from both the judges and commentators on the Internet. The next night, it was announced that she did not advance to the finals.

Performances/Results

Post-Idol Career

Lost Words (2011)
Barton released her debut EP, Lost Words, on September 1, 2011. It features seven pop, rock, and soul based songs.

Other ventures
In early 2013, Barton signed a "joint-venture publishing deal with Warner-Chappell & Pulse". She has co-written songs for Demi Lovato, Lea Michele, and American Idol finalist Jena Irene. Barton has worked as a background singer on Dancing with the Stars. In July 2015, it was announced that she would perform at the Miss USA 2015 pageant.

Barton also is the lead singer for the theme song of the 2017 reboot of the Disney animated series DuckTales.

Personal life
Barton's son Malachi (born March 10, 2007) portrayed Beast Diaz on Disney Channel's Stuck in the Middle and Colby on The Villains of Valley View.

Select songwriting discography

Ducktales theme song (2017)

Discography

Albums
Lost Words – EP (2011)
Other songsI'm Your Girl (2015) for the Descendants soundtrack.
 "In the House" (2019), performed with Scott Krippayne for 101 Dalmatian Street'' album

References

External links

Pulse Recordings website

1982 births
American women singer-songwriters
Living people
Singer-songwriters from Virginia
Musicians from Virginia Beach, Virginia
American Idol participants
21st-century American women singers